Carl Thompson (born February 5 1939) is a luthier and musician specializing in the construction of high-quality custom bass guitars. He is based in Brooklyn, New York.

Born in Pitcairn, Pennsylvania to a large musical family, Thompson moved to New York City in 1967 to pursue a career as a jazz guitarist. After working in a guitar shop to supplement his income, he started his own guitar repair business. He made his first instrument in 1974 and quickly gained renown in the craft.

Carl Thompson has invented several important designs for modern basses. The most important advances in design attributed to Carl are his invention of Neck-thru instruments using a single piece heel block, as well as lengthening the electric bass from a 34" scale to a 36" and 38", which extends the harmonic overtones producing a richer timbre that is more consistent with the traditional acoustic bass. The piccolo bass, a guitar of the same dimensions as a normal bass but tuned an octave higher, was envisioned by Stanley Clarke and first built for him by Carl. Carl also constructed the first six string contrabass guitar envisioned by Anthony Jackson. 

Carl's most popular endorsee is Les Claypool of the band Primus, who plays and owns seven Carl Thompson basses, his most famous being the Rainbow Bass, a six-string fretless bass made of several different woods. He has made at least four basses for Stanley Clarke. Clarke honored Thompson at one of his concerts and invited him on stage, calling him "a very great bass maker" and stating "(Carl) made one of my first piccolo basses. In fact, he made the first piccolo bass." Carl has also built guitars for Lou Reed and Hank Williams III.

Thompson basses are sought after, and he maintains a two-year waiting list, though some orders can take well over three years to complete. The cost for a basic four-string bass made by Thompson is about $5,500. Basses such as the "Rainbow Bass" can cost well over $10,000, although Carl will not make copies of the bass for his clients despite being asked to do so in the past. He maintains that all his basses are one-of-a-kind.

Thompson continues to be an active musician, practicing several hours a day, and performing once a week at a local Brooklyn restaurant. He has a fascination with jazz singers, and is a respected vocal coach of young singers.

References

https://web.archive.org/web/20130117213431/http://www.lucaspickford.net/transajgrooves.htm
https://ctbasses.com
https://ctbasses.com/guitar-player-magazine-march-1985 (Guitar Player Magazine, 1985)

External links
 Carl Thompson Basses web site
 .
 .
 Charles Farnsworth's (brother in law to Stanley Clarke) fretless all-cherry bass.
 The Rainbow Bass; made for Les Claypool.
 
The "$10 Million Bass" in Black Ebony.
 Les Claypool playing one of his seven Carl Thompson basses.
 The world's first six string bass by Carl Thompson; made for Anthony Jackson.
Lou Reed on stage with a one-of-a-kind Carl Thompson Guitar.

1939 births
Living people
People from Pitcairn, Pennsylvania
American luthiers
Guitar makers
Businesspeople from New York City